Ylvingen Chapel is a chapel of the Church of Norway in Vega Municipality in Nordland county, Norway. It is located on the island of Ylvingen. It is an annex chapel in the Vega parish which is part of the Sør-Helgeland prosti (deanery) in the Diocese of Sør-Hålogaland. The white, wooden chapel was built in a long church style in 1967 using plans drawn up by the architect Arne Reppen. The chapel seats about 80 people. The chapel was consecrated on 15 June 1967 by the Bishop Hans Edvard Wisløff.

See also
List of churches in Sør-Hålogaland

References

Churches in Nordland
Vega, Norway
Wooden churches in Norway
20th-century Church of Norway church buildings
Churches completed in 1967
1967 establishments in Norway
Long churches in Norway